Ironman Raceway is a motocross track in Crawfordsville, Indiana. Originating as a Grand National Cross Country venue beginning in 1995, the motocross course opened in 2014 due in part to the large success of the Ironman GNCC. The facility hosts events within the  Lucas Oil Pro Motocross Championship the  GNCC Racing Series, as well as a round of the ATV Motocross National Championship.

Ironman History
During a trip to the Blackwater 100  GNCC event in the early 1990s, the Shaver Family came in contact with race promoter, Dave Coombs. After some discussion with Big Dave, they felt their family farm may be suitable for a GNCC event. Dave would send his Son-in-Law, Jeff Russell, to Crawfordsville, Indiana to see the farm firsthand. After a brief tour, the decision was made to add the event to the GNCC schedule beginning in 1995. The event was named the "Ironman" in honor of two-time GNCC champion, Bob Sloan, who hailed from Indiana and passed away in 1994.

Over the years the Ironman GNCC would grow with large numbers of spectators and racers converging on the facility. In 2012, the decision was made to break ground on a new motocross facility that would begin hosting  Lucas Oil Pro Motocross Championship events beginning in 2014. Since then, the events have grown in size including the 2021 Ironman  GNCC which saw a record 2,710 racers take part in the event.

Past Pro Motocross Winners

450 Class

250 Class

GNCC Overall Winners

GNCC Bike Overall Winners
Beginning in 2021 two annual GNCC events held at Ironman Raceway with a spring event known as the Hoosier GNCC, in addition to the traditional Ironman GNCC in late fall.

GNCC ATV Overall Winners

ATV Motocross Past Winners

External links
 
 Ironman National Info

Motorsport venues in Indiana
Crawfordsville, Indiana
2014 in American motorsport
2014 establishments in Indiana